José Cerviño Cerviño, (August 21, 1920 – April 18, 2012) was a Spanish prelate of the Roman Catholic Church.

Cerviño was born in Aldán, Spain, and was ordained a priest on April 6, 1946, from the Archdiocese of Santiago de Compostela. Cerviño was appointed auxiliary bishop of the Archdiocese of Santiago de Compostela as well as titular bishop of  Benepota on June 4, 1968, and ordained bishop on July 28, 1968. On November 8, 1976, Cerviño was appointed bishop of the Diocese of Tui-Vigo where he would serve until his retirement on June 7, 1996.

See also
Roman Catholic Archdiocese of Santiago de Compostela

External links
Catholic-Hierarchy
Archdiocese of Santiago de Compostela 
Diocese of Tui-Vigo 

20th-century Roman Catholic bishops in Spain
1920 births
2012 deaths